Blaketown is a suburb to the west of Greymouth on the West Coast of New Zealand. The Grey River separates Blaketown from Cobden, and the Blaketown Lagoon separates it from the centre of Greymouth.

The town is named after Isaac Blake, an early storekeeper in the district.

Demographics

Blaketown had a population of 810 at the 2018 New Zealand census, a decrease of 30 people (-3.6%) since the 2013 census, and a decrease of 54 people (-6.2%) since the 2006 census. There were 375 households. There were 414 males and 396 females, giving a sex ratio of 1.05 males per female. The median age was 42.2 years (compared with 37.4 years nationally), with 135 people (16.7%) aged under 15 years, 147 (18.1%) aged 15 to 29, 390 (48.1%) aged 30 to 64, and 141 (17.4%) aged 65 or older.

Ethnicities were 93.3% European/Pākehā, 11.1% Māori, 1.9% Pacific peoples, 2.6% Asian, and 1.5% other ethnicities (totals add to more than 100% since people could identify with multiple ethnicities).

The proportion of people born overseas was 9.6%, compared with 27.1% nationally.

Although some people objected to giving their religion, 60.7% had no religion, 27.4% were Christian, 0.4% were Hindu, 0.7% were Muslim, 0.4% were Buddhist and 3.3% had other religions.

Of those at least 15 years old, 54 (8.0%) people had a bachelor or higher degree, and 234 (34.7%) people had no formal qualifications. The median income was $27,000, compared with $31,800 nationally. The employment status of those at least 15 was that 330 (48.9%) people were employed full-time, 108 (16.0%) were part-time, and 24 (3.6%) were unemployed.

Education
Blaketown School is a coeducational full primary (years 1–8) school with a roll of  students as of

References

Populated places in the West Coast, New Zealand
Suburbs of Greymouth